Tyrannus is a genus of small passerine birds of the tyrant flycatcher family native to the Americas. The majority are named as kingbirds.

Description
They prefer semi-open or open areas. These birds wait on an exposed perch and then catch insects in flight. They have long pointed wings and large broad bills. These birds tend to defend their breeding territories aggressively, often chasing away much larger birds. A kingbird was photographed in 2009 defending its young by landing on and sinking its talons into the back of a red-tailed hawk and pecking its skull until the red-tailed hawk gave up and flew away.

Taxonomy
The genus was introduced in 1799 by the French naturalist Bernard Germain de Lacépède with the eastern kingbird (Tyrannus tyrannus) as the type species. The genus name is the Latin word for 'tyrant'.

Species
The genus contains 13 species:

References